Callenya is an Indomalayan genus of butterflies in the family Lycaenidae.

Species
Callenya kaguya Eliot & Kawazoé, 1983 Palawan
Callenya lenya (Evans, 1932)
Callenya melaena (Doherty, 1889)

References

Polyommatini
Lycaenidae genera